Palaminus is a genus of rove beetles in the family Staphylinidae. There are about 16 described species in Palaminus.

Species
These 16 species belong to the genus Palaminus:

 Palaminus aequalis Bernhauer, ms c
 Palaminus apterus Bernhauer, 1918 g
 Palaminus dubius Notman, 1929 g
 Palaminus formosae Cameron, 1949 c g
 Palaminus formosanus Bernhauer, ms c
 Palaminus hudsonicus Casey, 1910 g
 Palaminus iaponicus Cameron g
 Palaminus insularis Cameron, 1913 g
 Palaminus japonicus Cameron, 1930 c g
 Palaminus larvalis b
 Palaminus lumiventris Herman, 2003 c g
 Palaminus luteus Casey, 1910 g
 Palaminus montanus Cameron, 1947 g
 Palaminus parvus Cameron, 1918 c g
 Palaminus rufulus Coiffait, 1978 c g
 Palaminus variabilis Erichson, 1840 g

Data sources: i = ITIS, c = Catalogue of Life, g = GBIF, b = Bugguide.net

References

Further reading

External links

 

Paederinae